Feynman's algorithm is an algorithm that is used to simulate the operations of a quantum computer on a  classical computer. It is based on the  Path integral formulation of quantum mechanics, which was formulated by Richard Feynman.

Overview
An  qubit quantum computer takes in a quantum circuit  that contains  gates and an input state . It then outputs a string of bits  with probability .

In Schrödinger's algorithm,  is calculated straightforwardly via matrix multiplication. That is, . The quantum state of the system can be tracked throughout its evolution.

In Feynman's path algorithm,  is calculated by summing up the contributions of  histories. That is, . 

Schrödinger's takes less time to run compared to Feynman's while Feynman's takes more time and less space.
More precisely, Schrödinger's takes   time and  space while Feynman's takes  time and  space.

Example
Consider the problem of creating a  Bell state. What is the probability that the resulting measurement will be ?

In that case,  using Schrödinger's algorithm.

Using Feynman's algorithm, the Bell state circuit contains  histories:  . So  = | +  +  + .

See also 
 Hamiltonian simulation
 Quantum simulation

References

Quantum algorithms